The 2014 Copa de España de Fútbol Sala was the 25th staging of the Copa de España de Fútbol Sala. It took place in Logroño, La Rioja between 13 and 16 March. The matches were played at Palacio de los Deportes de La Rioja for up to 4,500 seats. The tournament was hosted by La Rioja regional government, Logroño municipality and LNFS. This was the second time that Logroño hosted Copa de España after the 2012 edition.

FC Barcelona Intersport was the defending champion, but lost to Inter Movistar in semifinal. Inter Movistar eventually won its eighth Copa de España trophy after winning against ElPozo Murcia 4–3 in the final.

Qualified teams
The qualified teams were the eight first teams on standings at midseason.

Venue

Matches

Quarter-finals

Semi-finals

Final

Top 3 goalscorers

Source: own compilation

See also
2013–14 Primera División de Futsal
2013–14 Copa del Rey de Futsal

References

External links
Official website

Copa de España de Futsal seasons
Espana
Futsal